Rusty Knuckles Music is a record label based in Raleigh, North Carolina, United States.  The label was founded in 2008 by Ralph Miller, and is known for focusing on both digital and physical releases from bands in the Metal and Alt-Country genres. Its roster has included Hellbound Glory, Billy Don Burns, Antiseen, Reno Divorce, and WhiskeyDick. The label also specializes in leather-made accessories, including guitar straps and motorcycle bags.

Artists
Current

Antiseen
Billy Don Burns
Black Eyed Vermillion
Buzzoven
Carolina Still
Datura
Dripping Slits
Flat Tires
Hellbound Glory
Husky Burnette
Jay Berndt
JB Beverley
Kara Clark
Motobunny
Peewee Moore
Reno Divorce
Rory Kelly
She Rides
Stump Tail Dolly
The Go Devils
The Green Lady Killers
WhiskeyDick

See also
 List of record labels

References

American record labels
Alternative rock record labels
Indie rock record labels
Punk record labels